Coding-independent code points (CICP) is a way to signal the properties of a video or audio stream. It can describe the color profile of videos (and still images) in a simpler way than the use of ICC profiles. It is defined in both ITU-T H.273 and ISO/IEC 23091-2. It is used by multiple codecs including AVC, HEVC and AVIF.

Standardization 

ITU-T H.273, for video.

 ISO/IEC 23001-8:2016, part of MPEG-B (system technologies). Later split into three parts:
 ISO/IEC 23091-1:2018, for systems.
 ISO/IEC 23091-2:2019, for video. (Revised by ISO/IEC 23091-2:2021).
 ISO/IEC 23091-3:2018, for audio.

Common CICP values 
Common combinations of H.273 parameters are summarized in ITU-T Series H Supplement 19.

References 

ISO standards
International standards
Lists of standards
Standards by organization